Blanche Galton Whiffen, known on stage as Mrs. Thomas Whiffen, (1845–1936) was an American actress born in London.  She was educated in France; made her stage début at the Royalty Theatre, London, in 1865; came to America in 1868; and toured the United States under John Templeton's management.

In 1879 she played Buttercup in the first American production of Gilbert and Sullivan's Pinafore.  She joined Daniel Frohman's stock company at his old Lyceum Theatre, where she appeared in more than 25 plays between 1887 and 1899 including The Wife (1887), The Charity Ball (1889), and Trelawny of the 'Wells' (1898). Later she was part of Charles Frohman's company at the Empire. She became Broadway's resident old lady character player after the death of Mrs. G. H. Gilbert in 1904.  Mrs Whiffen in later years appeared in Zira (1905); The Great Divide (1905–07); The Builder of Bridges (1909); The Brass Bottle (1910); Electricity (1910); Cousin Kate (1912); Tante (1913); A Scrap of Paper (1914); Rosemary (1915).  She was still active at 70 and a great favorite.

Footnotes

Bibliography
Brown, Thomas Allston, A History of the New York Stage from the First Performance in 1732 to 1901, vol. III, New York: Dodd, Mead & Company, 1903.
Chapman, John and Garrison P. Sherwood, ed., The Best Plays of 1894-1899, New York: Dodd, Mead & Company, 1955.

External links
 Mrs. Whiffen
 Blanche Galton, 1868 (AlexanderStreet; North American Theatre Online)
 
 
 
 

19th-century American actresses
American stage actresses
Actresses from London
British emigrants to the United States
1845 births
1936 deaths
19th-century English women
19th-century English people